Tiy-merenese, Teye-Merenaset, Tiye-Mereniset (Tiy, Beloved of Isis) was the Great Royal Wife of pharaoh Setnakhte and mother of Ramesses III of the Twentieth Dynasty of Egypt.

She is the only known wife of Setnakhte. She was depicted together with her husband on a stela in Abydos. A priest named Meresyotef is shown adoring Setnakhte and Tiy-Merenese and their son Ramesses III is shown making offerings. Tiye-Merenese also appears on blocks found in Abydos which were reused in other buildings.

References

External links
Sacred Texts - Egypt

12th-century BC Egyptian women
Queens consort of the Twentieth Dynasty of Egypt